The 65th Air Defense Artillery was a training regiment in the United States Army.
During World War I the unit was a tractor drawn (TD) unit equipped with British BL 9.2 inch Howitzers. When it was reactivated in Panama in 1924 it became  an (AA) anti aircraft unit equipped with the 3-inch Gun M1918.

Lineage
Constituted 26 December 1917 in the Regular Army as the 1st Battalion 65th Artillery (Coast Artillery Corps) and organized 1 January 1918 at Fort Rosecrans, California. Demobilized 28 February 1919 at Camp Lewis, Washington. reconstituted 1 July 1924 in the regular army as 1st Battalion, 65th Coast Artillery (Antiaircraft) and activated at Fort Amador, Canal Zone; Inactivated 15 April 1932 at Fort Amador. Activated 1 June 1938 at Fort Winfield Scott, California. reorganized at Fort Ord, California and redesignated 10 May 1943 as the 65th Antiaircraft Artillery Gun Battalion (Semimobile). (Departed San Francisco Port of embarkation 12 July 1943 for overseas service and arrived in Alaska 22 July 1943. Returned from overseas service and arrived at the Seattle Port of embarkation on 16 December 1944). Inactivated (less Batteries B, C, and D,) 26 January 1945 at Camp Hood, Texas; Concurrently, Batteries B, C, and D, redesignated 427th, 428th, and 429th Antiaircraft Artillery Gun Batteries, respectively). Activated (with new Batteries B, C, and D,) 1 May 1949 on Okinawa. Redesignated 23 February 1955 as the 65th Antiaircraft Artillery Battalion. Inactivated 1 September 1959 in Japan. Consolidated 31 July 1959 with the 65th Artillery, a parent regiment under the Combat Arms Regimental System.

The regiment's insignia was redesignated effective 1 September 1971, for the 65th Air Defense Artillery Regiment.

Campaign streamers
World War I
 St. Mihiel
 Meuse-Argonne
 Lorraine
World War II
 Aleutian Islands

References

 Historical register and dictionary of the United States Army, from ..., Volume 1 By Francis Bernard Heitman 
 Encyclopedia of United States Army insignia and uniforms By William K. Emerson (page 51).
  lineage
 Coast Artillery Journal December 1927 page 511

External links
 http://www.history.army.mil/html/forcestruc/lh.html
 http://www.missilesofkeywest.com/65thHISTORY.html
 http://freepages.military.rootsweb.ancestry.com/~cacunithistories/65th%20Arty.html
 https://books.google.com/books?id=NicDAAAAMBAJ&pg=PA94&lpg=PA94&dq=65th+Coast+Artillery+Regiment&source=bl&ots=Oo00yICuG0&sig=oKaMS9p0CFqHzqS-_2UGr8DCgZA&hl=en&ei=0g9dTsPIE4-cgQe-ytGaAg&sa=X&oi=book_result&ct=result&resnum=10&ved=0CFEQ6AEwCTgU#v=onepage&q=65th%20Coast%20Artillery%20Regiment&f=false

065
Military units and formations established in 1917